The 41st District of the Iowa House of Representatives in the state of Iowa.

Current elected officials
Jo Oldson is the representative currently representing the district.

Past representatives
The district has previously been represented by:
 Emil J. Husak, 1971–1973
 Norman P. Dunlap, 1973–1975
 Neal Hines, 1975–1979
 Charles Hughes Bruner, 1979–1983
 Thomas H. Fey, 1983–1991
 Matthew Wissing, 1991–1993
 David Millage, 1993–2003
 Paul Bell, 2003–2010
 Daniel Kelley, 2010–2013
 Jo Oldson, 2013–present

References

041